Maxin may refer to:

 Ernest Maxin (1923–2018), British television producer and director
 Fritz Maxin (1885–1960), German politician and lay preacher
 A trade name for a kind of jet nebulizer